Techi Hemu is an Indian politician and member of the Bharatiya Janata Party. Hemu was a member of the Arunachal Pradesh Legislative Assembly from the Pakke-Kessang constituency in East Kameng district in 2004.

References 

People from East Kameng district
Bharatiya Janata Party politicians from Arunachal Pradesh
Arunachal Pradesh MLAs 2004–2009
Living people
21st-century Indian politicians
Year of birth missing (living people)